Kinoma, a division of Marvell Semiconductor, is a software engineering group providing an open-source, cross-platform ECMAScript stack aimed at developing software for Internet of Things products and other embedded devices. Additionally, Kinoma provides Kinoma Create, a hardware prototyping platform aimed at the independent maker community.

Kinoma initially offered consumer media players for the Palm OS Treo lineup.  It expanded its offering starting in 2008 with Windows Mobile 6 and Symbian S60 devices, and in 2012 offered Kinoma Play for Android.  Additionally, Kinoma licenses its core technologies for embedded/OEM products including Sling Media, Sprint Mobile TV, and Sony among others.

Kinoma Player for Palm 
Kinoma Player was offered as a default media player in Palm Treo based devices.

Kinoma Player 4 EX was also sold as a premium media player on Palm OS based phones until August 2010, which featured Kinoma Guide and YouTube video search.  Kinoma Player 4 EX was sold until August 2010, and reached its support end-of-life on October 1, 2010.

Kinoma Play
Kinoma Play, introduced at Mobile World Congress 2011 and released on March 13, 2012, was a combination media player, media browser, and app platform.  The default app in Kinoma Play, Kinoma Guide, contained mobile-specific content from a variety of sources on the Internet.  Kinoma Play also had downloadable apps to extend its capabilities, such as Box.net, ORB, ShoutCAST, as well as social media clients for Twitter, Facebook, and Foursquare among others. Kinoma Play featured "dashboards" that aggregated search results from any installed Kinoma Play apps in one screen.

Windows Mobile 6.X/Symbian S60 - 2008-2012
Kinoma Play was introduced for Windows Mobile 6.0 devices on August 25, 2008, for $29.95, with Kinoma FreePlay available to users as a demo of the Kinoma Guide.  Kinoma Play was eventually made available on Symbian S60 phones on September 15, 2009.  No version of Kinoma was made for successive platforms from either Microsoft or Symbian.  On March 12, 2012, after announcing Android general availability, Kinoma removed their online store to pay for the app on Windows Mobile and Symbian.

On April 1, 2012, all Windows Mobile and Symbian Kinoma products were discontinued.

Android - 2012 – 2014
In February 2011, shortly after being acquired by Marvell, Kinoma announced an Android platform beta of their Kinoma Play app.  On March 12, 2012, Kinoma released a preview copy of Kinoma Play for Android to the public, which was offered free of charge, also announcing that the final version of the app will also be offered free of charge.  On January 6, 2014, Kinoma announced the discontinuation of availability and support for the app.

Kinoma Connect 
Kinoma Connect, introduced at CES 2014, is an app for Android and iOS designed to stream media and podcasts from a handheld device or tablet to DLNA-equipped devices such as smart TVs and Blu-ray players.

Kinoma Create 
On March 10, 2014, Kinoma introduced Kinoma Create, a "JavaScript-powered Internet of Things construction kit" via an Indiegogo campaign that achieved over five times its funding goal. It is positioned to provide JavaScript developers a more accessible way to demo and prototype internet-connected devices.

KinomaJS 
KinomaJS is a solution stack featuring an ECMAScript 6 virtual machine, a development framework, an abstraction layer providing platform/OS independence, and other utilities, functions and extensions.

On March 1, 2015, KinomaJS was posted on GitHub as open-source under  Apache License 2.0.

On January 5, 2016, San Diego based AstroPrint demonstrated a prototype 3D Printer in partnership with KinomaJS at CES 2016. The project was a fully functional, commercial example of the KinomaJS framework.

, KinomaJS repository on GitHub is unmaintained and succeeded by Moddable project.

History 
Kinoma was founded in 2002 by ex-Apple employees Peter Hoddie, Brian Friedkin, Michael Kellner, and Elizabeth Dykstra-Erickson to design and build mobile media products. All four founders worked together in Apple's QuickTime team.

On February 14, 2011, Marvell announced they had acquired Kinoma.

As of February 2019, the Kinoma website displays "Kinoma websites are no longer being supported." Peter Hoddie, Brian Friedkin and Michael Kellner are now listed as team members of Palo-Alto-based Internet-of-Things startup Moddable.

References

External links
 Kinoma
 Kinoma's blog
 Wall Street Journal review of Kinoma Play: "Better Media Navigation for Your Mobile"

Software companies based in California
Mobile software
Windows Mobile Standard software
Pocket PC software
Software companies of the United States
2002 establishments in California
Software companies established in 2002
Companies established in 2002